Mark Jay Lawrence (born January 27, 1972) is a Canadian former professional ice hockey winger who played in the National Hockey League for the Dallas Stars and the New York Islanders.

Early life
Lawrence was born in Burlington, Ontario. As a youth, he played in the 1985 Quebec International Pee-Wee Hockey Tournament with a minor ice hockey team from Burlington.

Career 
Lawrence was drafted 118th overall by the Minnesota North Stars in the 1991 NHL Entry Draft. He had a spell in the East Coast Hockey League with the Dayton Bombers and three seasons in the International Hockey League (IHL) with the Kalamazoo Wings.  

He made his NHL debut with the Dallas Stars, playing two games during the 1994–95 NHL season. He played 13 more games for the Stars the next season before moving to the New York Islanders in 1997 as a free agent. He received more ice time with the Islanders with his best season coming in 1998–99, scoring 14 goals and 16 assists for 30 points in 60 games. In all, Lawrence played 142 regular season games, scoring 18 goals and 26 assists for 44 points and collected 115 penalty minutes.

In 2001, he returned to the Kalamazoo Wings who were now in the United Hockey League. He joined as a player/assistant coach, but missed a majority of the 2001–02 season due to a knee injury. In February 2002, he became interim head coach of the Wings for the remainder of the 2001–02 season, replacing Dennis Desrosiers, but only won 5 of 22 games as the Wings failed to make the playoffs. He played one more season with the Wings before retiring. 

In 2015, he was hired as the head coach of the West Michigan Wolves, a Tier III junior team in the North American 3 Hockey League, after six seasons as a youth coach in West Michigan.

Career statistics

References

External links

1972 births
Living people
Canadian ice hockey forwards
Chicago Wolves players
Dallas Stars players
Dayton Bombers players
Detroit Compuware Ambassadors players
Ice hockey people from Ontario
Kalamazoo Wings (1974–2000) players
Kalamazoo Wings (UHL) players
Lowell Lock Monsters players
Minnesota North Stars draft picks
New York Islanders players
Niagara Falls Thunder players
North Bay Centennials players
Sportspeople from Burlington, Ontario
Utah Grizzlies (AHL) players